Hamid Dawud Mohamed Khalil al-Zawi (1959 – 18 April 2010), known as Abu Hamza al-Baghdadi and Abu Omar al-Qurashi al-Baghdadi, was the leader of the militant groups Mujahideen Shura Council, and its successor, the Islamic State of Iraq, which fought against US forces and their Iraqi allies in the Iraq War.

Biography 

Abu Omar was born Hamid Dawud Muhammad Khalil al-Zawi in 1959 in the village of Al-Zawiyah, close to Haditha in Al-Anbar Governorate. He descended from the Qurayshi Al-Arajiyah. He graduated from the Police Academy in Baghdad and served as a police officer in Haditha. In 1993, he was dismissed from the police for Salafist ideology. After leaving the police, he worked at an electronics repair shop and served as the imam of the al-Asaf mosque.

Following the 2003 invasion of Iraq by the United States, he formed his own small insurgent group and took part in the Iraqi insurgency.

At some point, he was arrested after US forces searched his house on suspicion he was harboring foreign Arab fighters. He was transported to Al Asad Airbase and his computer was searched.

He decided to start working along Jama'at al-Tawhid wal-Jihad after meeting Abu Muhammad al-Lubnani and Abu Anas al-Shami. At this stage Abu Omar went by the kunya 'Abu Mahmud'.

One famous incident regarding Abu Omar is when he was traveling from Haditha to Baghdad by car with his family. Ahead of him was a militant escort vehicle that was exploring the road to check if there were American checkpoints. After the escort vehicle had pulled away, there was a checkpoint that stood in the road and forced him to enter the city of Hit for inspection. He was asked by one of the guards to show his identification card and he presented his Al-Arajiah notables identification card. The soldier was surprised and thought that Abu Omar was a Shiite. He said to him, "Sayyid how could you come to such a place, as these areas are filled with terrorists, and if they know about you, they will kill you." He told him there was news from Haditha stating there was a major terrorist who had left Haditha accompanied by his family, and that he was heading east, and they must search all the vehicles. He did not search the Abu Omar's vehicle and told the Americans there was no need to search him. Abu Omar was allowed to leave the checkpoint.

After his work in Anbar, he was transferred to Baghdad where he worked in the Shura Council and Shari'ah Council of the organization. His kunya at that time was Abu-Marwah. He was also in charge of security in Baghdad Province for some time. Afterwards, he became the governor of Diyala for the group.

Controversy over identity 
In July 2007, U.S. military spokesman Brigadier General Kevin Bergner, claimed that Abu Omar al-Baghdadi did not actually exist, and that all of his audio statements were actually read by an elderly Iraqi actor.

The detainee identified as Khaled al-Mashhadani, a self-proclaimed intermediary to Osama bin Laden, claimed that al-Baghdadi was a fictional character created to give an Iraqi face to a foreign-run group. In March 2008, the spokesman for a rival insurgent organization, Hamas-Iraq, also claimed that al-Baghdadi was a fabrication made by Al-Qaeda to put an Iraqi face on their organization. However, US military officials later came to believe that the position of al-Baghdadi had been back-filled by an actual commander.

Reports of arrest or death 
The Interior Ministry of Iraq claimed that al-Baghdadi was captured in Baghdad on 9 March 2007, but it was later said that the person in question was not him. On 3 May 2007, the Iraqi Interior Ministry said that al-Baghdadi had been killed by American and Iraqi forces north of Baghdad. On 23 April 2009, AFP reported that he had been arrested by the Iraqi military, and on 28 April the Iraqi government produced photos to prove it to skeptics. The claim was denied by the Islamic State in Iraq which according to SITE Institute released a recording of al-Baghdadi denying the government's claims. The Iraqi government continued to insist that the man captured was indeed Baghdadi, however tapes and messages from Baghdadi were released throughout 2009 and 2010.

Death 
ISI Minister of War Abu Ayyub al-Masri and al-Baghdadi's son were also killed in the attack and 16 others were arrested.

Iraqi Prime Minister Nouri al-Maliki announced the killings of al-Baghdadi and al-Masri at a news conference in Baghdad and showed reporters photographs of their corpses. "The attack was carried out by ground forces which surrounded the house, and also through the use of missiles", al-Maliki said. "During the operation computers were seized with e-mails and messages to the two biggest terrorists, Osama bin Laden and [his deputy] Ayman al-Zawahiri", al-Maliki added. U.S. forces commander Gen. Raymond Odierno praised the operation. "The death of these terrorists is potentially the most significant blow to al-Qaida in Iraq since the beginning of the insurgency", he said. "There is still work to do but this is a significant step forward in ridding Iraq of terrorists".

Vice President Joe Biden said that the killings were "potentially devastating" blows to the terror network there and proof that Iraqi security forces are gaining ground. On 25 April 2010, a four-page statement by the Islamic State of Iraq was posted on a militant website early Sunday confirmed the death of al-Masri and Al-Baghdadi, saying "After a long journey filled with sacrifices and fighting falsehood and its representatives, two knights have dismounted to join the group of martyrs," the statement said. "We announce that the Muslim nation has lost two of the leaders of jihad, and two of its men, who are only known as heroes on the path of jihad." The ISI sharia minister, Abu al-Walid Abd al-Wahhab al-Mashadani, said the two leaders were attending a meeting when enemy forces engaged them in battle and launched an airstrike on their location.

He was succeeded by Abu Bakr al-Baghdadi, who became the caliph of the Islamic State of Iraq and the Levant (ISIL).

See also 
 23 April 2009 Iraqi suicide attacks
 Abu Suleiman al-Naser

References

External links 

1959 births
2010 deaths
Assassinated al-Qaeda leaders
Fugitives
Fugitives wanted by Iraq
Iraqi al-Qaeda members
Iraqi Islamists
Iraqi Sunni Muslims
Leaders of Islamic terror groups
Members of al-Qaeda in Iraq
People from Al Anbar Governorate